Cape Verdeans in the Netherlands consist of migrants from Cape Verde to the Netherlands and their descendants. , figures from Statistics Netherlands showed 20,961 people of Cape Verdean origin in the Netherlands (people from Cape Verde, or those with a parent from there).

Migration history
Early migration from Cape Verde to the Netherlands began in the 1960s and 1970s. The migrants consisted primarily of young men who had signed on as sailors on Dutch ships, and as such they concentrated primarily in the port city of Rotterdam, especially the Heemraadsplein area. Prior to independence in 1975, Cape Verdean immigrants were registered as Portuguese immigrants from the overseas province of Portuguese Cape Verde. Another wave of migration began in 1975, following the independence of Cape Verde from Portugal; this new wave of migrants comprised primarily teachers, soldiers, and other lower officials of the former government. There was an immigration amnesty for Cape Verdean migrants in 1976.

From 1996 to 2010, the number of Cape Verdeans in the Netherlands recorded by Statistics Netherlands grew by roughly 25% from a base of 16,662 people; about three-quarters of the growth in that period was in the 2nd-generation category (people born in the Netherlands to one or two migrant parents from Cape Verde).

Distribution
Approximately 90% live in the Rotterdam metropolitan area. In Rotterdam, the largest concentration live in Delfshaven, where they make up about 8.8% of the borough's population. The city has more than 60 Cape Verdean civil organisations. Smaller groups can be found in other cities such as Schiedam, Amsterdam, Zaanstad, and Delfzijl.

Employment and business
Cape Verdeans generally have better labour market outcomes than other migrant groups like Turks or Moroccans, similar to those of Surinamese, but worse than those of natives. The various Cape Verdean-run hair salons of Rotterdam often serve as gathering points for the women of the community. Other common ethnic business niches include transport businesses and travel agencies. The Cape Verdeans are also renown in the music industry and currently developing within the contemporary fine arts.

Notable people

Luc Castaignos, footballer
Alex Da Silva, Artist
Miguel Dias, boxer
E-Life, rapper
Eddy "Eddy Fort Moda Grog" Fortes, rapper
Nelson Freitas, singer, writer and producer
Alviar Lima, kickboxer
Suzanna Lubrano, singer
Dina Medina (1975-), singer
Gery "GMB" Mendes, musician and actor
David Mendes da Silva, footballer
Sonia Pereira (1972-), psychic, medium, television presenter and actress
Gil Semedo, singer
Sonja Silva (1977-), presenter, actress, model and singer
Luis Tavares, kickboxer
 Lerin Duarte
 Deroy Duarte

See also

List of Cape Verdeans
Demographics of Cape Verde

Notes

Sources

Further reading

External links
Embassy of Cape Verde in the Netherlands
Migration and Major Cities Policy in Rotterdam 
Gemeente Rotterdam

African diaspora in the Netherlands
 
Ethnic groups in the Netherlands